Pegah Zangeneh Karkooti (born February 6, 1984, in Kermanshah) is an Iranian karateka and coach. 
She began karate training at age eight with her first coach, Maryam Moshiri, at Milad club in Kermanshah. She then continued karate training under supervision her brother, Babak Zangeneh. she won the 2018 Jakarta Asian Games Bronze medal. Currently, she is one of Iranian karate national female team's coach.

See also 
 Asian Games
 Asian Karate Championships
 Karate1 Premier League

References

External links 
Iranian Medalist in Asian Games
karate record
Tasnim Agency
wkf ranking 
Pegah Zangeneh on instagram

1984 births
Sportspeople from Kermanshah
Living people
Iranian female karateka
Asian Games bronze medalists for Iran
Asian Games medalists in karate
Karateka at the 2014 Asian Games
Karateka at the 2018 Asian Games
Medalists at the 2018 Asian Games
Islamic Solidarity Games medalists in karate
20th-century Iranian women
21st-century Iranian women
Islamic Solidarity Games competitors for Iran